Chandradeo Prasad Rajbhar (born 2 January 1953) is an Indian politician for the Ghosi (Lok Sabha constituency) in Uttar Pradesh.

External links
 Official biographical sketch in Parliament of India website

1953 births
Living people
People from Mau
People from Mau district
India MPs 2004–2009
Samajwadi Party politicians
Samajwadi Party politicians from Uttar Pradesh